Thomas John Lynch (31 August 1907 – 1976) was a Welsh professional footballer who played in the Football League for Rochdale, Barnsley, Barrow and Watford as a goalkeeper.

Career statistics

References 

Welsh footballers
English Football League players
1907 births
1976 deaths
Sportspeople from Tredegar
Association football goalkeepers
Southern Football League players
Rochdale A.F.C. players
Colwyn Bay F.C. players
Barnsley F.C. players
Barrow A.F.C. players
Yeovil Town F.C. players
Watford F.C. players
Gloucester City A.F.C. players
Bangor City F.C. players